Philippine Airlines Flight 443 was an early morning domestic flight that crashed into Mount Gurain, Philippines, on December 19, 1987. The Short 360-300 operating the route departed Mactan–Cebu International Airport at 6:42 a.m. local time. The last radio contact was at 7:17 a.m, local time, when the aircraft was closing in on Iligan. Shortly after, the aircraft crashed. All 15 people on board the plane, 11 passengers and 4 crew, were confirmed dead.

This would be the first fatal accident involving a Short 360.

References 

1987 in the Philippines
Aviation accidents and incidents in 1987
443
Aviation accidents and incidents in the Philippines
Accidents and incidents involving the Short 360
History of Lanao del Norte
December 1987 events in Asia